The following is a list of pipeline accidents in the United States in 1992. It is one of several lists of U.S. pipeline accidents. See also: list of natural gas and oil production accidents in the United States.

Incidents 

This is not a complete list of all pipeline accidents. For natural gas alone, the Pipeline and Hazardous Materials Safety Administration (PHMSA), a United States Department of Transportation agency, has collected data on more than 3,200 accidents deemed serious or significant since 1987.

A "significant incident" results in any of the following consequences:
 Fatality or injury requiring in-patient hospitalization.
 $50,000 or more in total costs, measured in 1984 dollars.
 Liquid releases of five or more barrels (42 US gal/barrel).
 Releases resulting in an unintentional fire or explosion.

PHMSA and the National Transportation Safety Board (NTSB) post-incident data and results of investigations into accidents involving pipelines that carry a variety of products, including natural gas, oil, diesel fuel, gasoline, kerosene, jet fuel, carbon dioxide, and other substances. Occasionally pipelines are re-purposed to carry different products.

The following incidents occurred during 1992:
 1992 On January 3, an 8-inch Columbia Gas Transmission pipeline in West Finley Township, Washington County, Pennsylvania failed from earth subsidence, caused by a coal mine. Leaking gas entered a nearby home, causing it to explode. There were no injuries.
 1992 A pipeline carrying a mixture of crude oil and water burst on January 5 in Anchorage, Alaska, spilling 16,900 gallons of crude oil into Cook Inlet.
 1992 On January 6, an ExxonMobil pipeline offshore of Grand Isle, Louisiana in the Gulf of Mexico leaked about 4200 gallons of crude oil.
 A spill from a Williams Companies pipeline was discovered on January 13, in a soybean field, near Renner, South Dakota. The cause of the leak was identified as a hairline crack in the seam. About 400,000 gallons of petroleum products was lost. The leak may have started as long as 6 months before.
 1992 On January 17, while a gas company crew was doing routine annual maintenance work at a regulator station in Chicago, Illinois, high-pressure gas entered a low-pressure gas system. The gas—under as much as 10 psig of pressure—escaped through gas appliances into homes and other buildings, where it was ignited by several unidentified sources. The resulting explosion and fires killed 4 people, injured 4, and damaged 14 houses and 3 commercial buildings.
 1992 On March 4, a gas distribution pipeline failed in Utica, New York, killing 2 people.
 1992 Construction equipment ruptured a Sun Co. petroleum products pipeline in Edgemont, Pennsylvania on March 4, spilling about 933 barrels of heating oil, that reached Chester Creek.
 1992 On March 11, a crude oil pipeline ruptured in Leitchfield, Kentucky, then the crude oil was ignited, causing a fire at a pump station that forced the evacuation of 69 families. About 3,780 barrels of crude were lost. The cause of the rupture was external corrosion. 
 1992 Two Tennessee Gas Pipeline lines exploded and burned in White Bluff, Tennessee on March 15, destroying 3 homes, and burning 400 acres. 100 people in a 4 square miles area nearby were evacuated, and 2 people treated at a hospital for injuries from the incident.
 1992 On April 7, a salt dome cavern used to store LPG & similar products was overfilled, leading to an uncontrolled release of highly volatile liquids (HVLs) from a salt dome storage cavern near Brenham, Texas, formed a large, heavier-than-air gas cloud that later exploded. Three people died from injuries sustained either from the blast, or in the following fire. An additional 21 people were treated for injuries at area hospitals. Damage from the accident exceeded $9 million.
 1992 On April 27, a 6-inch petroleum products pipeline ruptured, in Lakeland, Florida, spilling about 1,674 gallons of jet fuel. The cause was third party damage.
 1992 A contractor planting trees hit a gas pipeline, in Rochester, Michigan, on May 20. The gas later exploded, destroying a 2-story building, killing one person, and injuring 14 others.
 1992 On May 27, excavation work ruptured a Sunoco pipeline, in Pierson County, Oklahoma, spilling about 7,500 gallons of petroleum product. 
 1992 On June 19, an 8-inch ARCO petroleum products pipeline ruptured, due to control problems, spraying a neighborhood in Victoria, Texas with gasoline. Some residents were evacuated as long as 3 days afterwards. There was no fire. About 6700 gallons of gasoline were released.
 On September 6, an Amoco pipeline spilled about 12,000 gallons of petroleum product, in Hammond, Indiana.
 1992 A gas transmission pipeline that was being moved on October 9 exploded & burned, near Elwin, Illinois, killing one worker. 2 firefighters were also injured in controlling the situation.
 1992 On October 13, a bulldozer hit a Buckeye Partners pipeline in Moon, Pennsylvania, spilling about 105 barrels of jet turbine fuel.
 1992 On October 14, a heavy equipment operator hit a 10-inch Gulf Coast Natural Gas Company line carrying gas at 420 psi near Wharton, Texas. The escaping gas exploded, then burned, but the operator was unhurt.
 1992 A natural gas explosion destroyed a house, in Catskill (town), New York, on November 6. The house had not had active gas service since 1969. The explosion killed a woman in the house, seriously injured her daughter, and slightly injured two children in a neighboring house. Gas had escaped from a nearby cracked gas main.
 1992 On December 3, pipeline company workers ruptured a natural gas liquid (NGL) pipeline, causing a vapor cloud to drift across I-70 near Aurora, Colorado. The Cloud later ignited, burning 6 motorists.
 1992 On December 31, a Sunoco pipeline failed at a weld, in Chester County, Pennsylvania, spilling about 27,000 gallons of petroleum product.

References

Lists of pipeline accidents in the United States